= Alessio Sitti =

Italian volleyball player (born 1996)

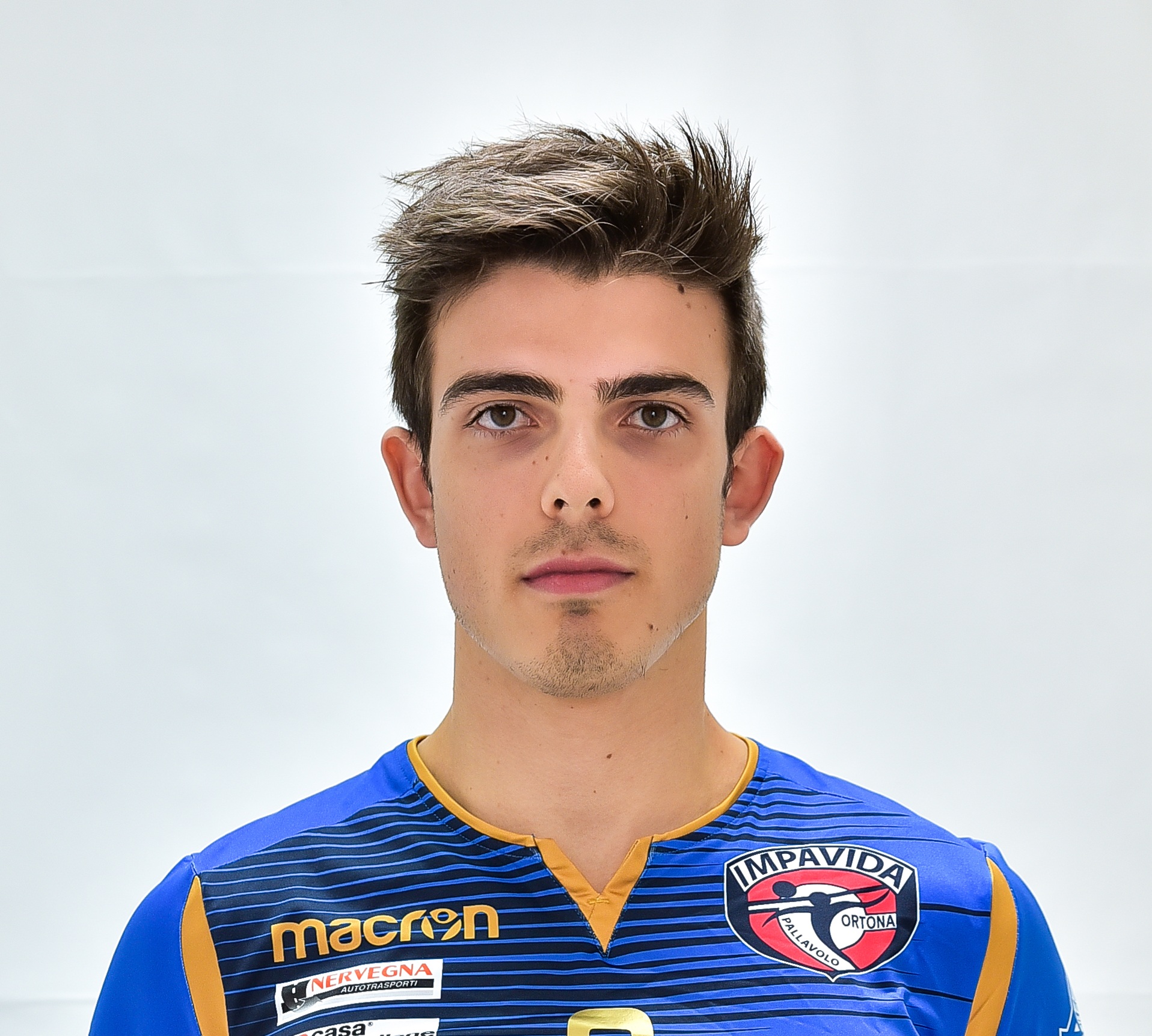

Personal information
- Nationality: Italian
- Born: March 18, 1996 (age 30)
- Height: 1.83 cm (1 in)

Volleyball information
- Position: Setter
- Current club: (Italy) San Giustino Pallavolo

Career
| Years | Teams |
|---|---|
| 2012-2013; 2013-2014; 2014-2015; 2015-2016; 2016-2017; 2017-2019; 2019- | (Italy) Sieco Service Ortona (Italy) Pallavolo Lube Macerata (Italy) Pallavolo Appignano (Italy) Jolly Cinquefrondi (Italy) Ciu Ciu Offida Volley (Italy) Sieco Service Ortona (Italy) Stadium Mirandola |

Alessio Sitti (born March 18, 1996) is an Italian volleyball player, a member of the club San Giustino Pallavolo.
